Clarence William Sessions (February 8, 1859 – April 1, 1931) was a United States district judge of the United States District Court for the Western District of Michigan.

Education and career

Born in North Plains Township, Ionia County, Michigan, Sessions received an Artium Baccalaureus degree from the University of Michigan in 1881 and read law to enter the bar in 1883. He was in private practice in Ionia, Michigan from 1883 to 1885, and in Muskegon, Michigan from 1885 to 1906. He was a Judge of the Circuit Court of Michigan from 1906 to 1911.

Federal judicial service

On February 25, 1911, Sessions was nominated by President William Howard Taft to a seat on the United States District Court for the Western District of Michigan vacated by Judge Arthur Carter Denison. Sessions was confirmed by the United States Senate on March 2, 1911, and received his commission the same day, serving thereafter until his death on April 1, 1931, in Grand Rapids, Michigan.

Disability

As a result of the performance of his judicial duties, Sessions health broke down, circa 1924, leaving him unable to handle the full extent of his duties. Sessions was the only Judge assigned to the Western District of Michigan at that time. The statute also provided that upon Session's death, resignation or retirement, the resulting vacancy would not be filled. Fred Morton Raymond was appointed to the new judgeship by President Calvin Coolidge on May 8, 1925. After Raymond's appointment, Session's shortly thereafter ceased the performance of any judicial duties, but remained a judge until his death.

References

Sources
 

1859 births
1931 deaths
Michigan state court judges
Judges of the United States District Court for the Western District of Michigan
United States district court judges appointed by William Howard Taft
20th-century American judges
People from Ionia, Michigan
University of Michigan alumni
United States federal judges admitted to the practice of law by reading law